The Government of Perlis refers to the state government of Perlis. Its powers and structure are set out in the Constitution of the State of Perlis (Undang-undang Tubuh Kerajaan Negeri Perlis).

In modern Malaysian use, the term "government" refers broadly to the cabinet (formally the Executive Council of Perlis) of the day, elected from the Perlis State Legislative Assembly and the non-political staff within each state department or agency – that is, the civil and public services. The civil service that manages and delivers government policies, programs, and services is called the Perlis Public Service.

The state of Perlis, like all Malaysian states, is governed by a constitutional monarchy and parliamentary democracy with a unicameral legislature—the Perlis State Legislative Assembly, which operates in the Westminster system of government. The political party or coalition that wins the largest number of seats in the legislature normally forms the government, and the party's leader becomes Menteri Besar of the state, i.e., the head of the government.

Executive

Head of government and Cabinet

Almost always made up of members of the Perlis State Legislative Assembly, the Executive Council of Perlis (Majlis Mesyuarat Kerajaan Negeri Perlis) is similar in structure and role to the Cabinet of Malaysia while being smaller in size. As federal and state responsibilities differ there are a number of different portfolios between the federal and state governments.

The Raja of Perlis serve as constitutional and ceremonial head of state of Perlis. Although the Raja is technically the most powerful person in Perlis, he is in reality a figurehead whose actions are restricted by custom and constitutional convention. The government is therefore headed by the Menteri Besar. The Menteri Besar is normally a member of the Legislative Assembly, and draws all the members of the Executive Council from among the members of the Legislative Assembly. Most executive councillors are the chairman of a committee, but this is not always the case.

The executive powers in the state are vested in the monarch and are exercised by the Menteri Besar of Perlis and the Executive Council, who are responsible to the Perlis State Legislative Assembly, advising the Raja on how to exercise the Royal Prerogative and other executive powers. In the construct of constitutional monarchy and responsible government, the executive councillors advice tendered is typically binding, though it is important to note that, despite appearances of the contrary, the Royal Prerogative belongs to the Crown, not to any of the executive councillors.

As at the federal level the most important Executive Council post after that of the leader is Executive Councillor in charge of Finance. Today the next most powerful position is certainly the health portfolio which has a vast budget and is of central political importance. Other powerful portfolios include Education and Security.

Legislative

The legislative powers in the state however, lie with the Perlis State Legislative Assembly. Its government resembles that of the other Malaysian states. The capital of the state is Kangar, where the Perlis State Assembly Building is located. Government is conducted after the Westminster model.

The Legislative Assembly consists of 15 members, elected first past the post (FPTP) from single-member constituencies. The current Legislature is the 13th, since 1959. The last election was held on 5 May 2013, and returned a majority parliament controlled by the Barisan Nasional.

Departments and statutory bodies

Departments
 Office of the State Treasury of Perlis
 Perlis State Mufti Department
 Perlis Syariah Judiciary Department
 Perlis Public Works Department
 Perlis Lands and Mines Department
Perlis State Irrigation and Drainage Department
 Department of Islamic Religious Affairs of Perlis
 Perlis State Veterinary Services Department
 Perlis State Agriculture Department
 Perlis State Forestry Department
 Perlis Social Welfare Department
 Perlis Town and Country Planning Department

Statutory bodies
 Perlis State Economic Development Corporation
 Perlis State Public Library Corporation
 Perlis State Islamic Foundation
 Perlis Islamic Religious and Malay Customs Council

See also
List of Menteris Besar of Perlis

References